The Great Synagogue of Brody, also known as the Old Fortress Synagogue, was the main synagogue of the Jewish community in Brody. Constructed in the mid-18th century, the building was significantly damaged by the Nazis in 1943, and has since fallen into disrepair.

History
On the site of the Great Synagogue was originally a wooden synagogue, which was destroyed in a fire in 1696. In its place the large stone fortress synagogue was built, starting in 1742. It was damaged in a fire which destroyed most of Brody in 1859. Repairs began at the beginning of the next century, and in 1935 it was registered as a cultural monument and renovated.

The Great Synagogue held a large collection of Jewish ceremonial art, and its interior was richly decorated.

See also
 History of the Jews in Brody

References

18th-century synagogues
Ashkenazi synagogues
Brody
Former synagogues in Ukraine
Fortress synagogues
Orthodox synagogues in Ukraine
Renaissance architecture in Ukraine
Renaissance synagogues
Synagogues destroyed by Nazi Germany